William Pinkney Toler (1826–1899) was born in Caracas, Venezuela, on December 23, 1826, the son of a United States diplomat.  Toler was educated in Washington, D.C., and joined the Navy at age 14.  As a midshipman on the  under the command of Commodore Thomas Gatsby Jones, he hoisted the first American flag up the flagpole of the Custom House at Monterey in 1842.  Toler arrived in Hawaii on the United States in 1843.  He made a two- or three-day round trip on horseback to sketch Mount Kilauea.

Toler resigned from the Navy in 1848 and accepted a position as assistant to the alcalde, or chief executive officer, in San Francisco.  In 1853, he married Maria Peralta, whose family owned the large land grant that is now the city of Oakland, California.  He eventually settled in San Leandro, California, where he spent his remaining years.  Toler died there on January 24, 1899.

References
 Severson, Don R., "Finding Paradise, Island Art in Private Collections", University of Hawaii Press, 2002, 76-77.

19th-century American painters
19th-century American male artists
American male painters
Volcano School painters
American landscape painters
1826 births
1899 deaths